Castianeira thalia is a species of true spider in the family Corinnidae. It is found in the United States.

References

Corinnidae
Articles created by Qbugbot
Spiders described in 1969